Jung Yeon-woong (born 31 August 1992) is a South Korean footballer who plays as a midfielder for TuRU Düsseldorf.

Career

At the age of 17, Jung signed for Brazilian side Jacareí. Before the 2011 season, he signed for Daejeon Hana Citizen in the South Korean top flight, where he made 1 appearance and scored 0 goals. On 11 May 2011, Jung debuted for Daejeon Hana Citizen during a 1-1 draw with Daegu FC. Before the 2012 season, he was sent on loan to Japanese fourth division club V-Varen Nagasaki, where he suffered injuries and said, "I'm a foreign player in Japan, but because I couldn't go to the game, they gave me a headache. At that time, I learned how to live fiercely."

Before the second half of 2013-13, Jung signed for KSV Hessen Kassel in the German fourth division. In 2018, he signed for South Korean sixth division team Winner Star. In 2020, Jung signed for German fifth division outfit Siegburger SV 04.

References

External links
 
 

South Korean footballers
Living people
Expatriate footballers in Brazil
Expatriate footballers in Germany
Association football midfielders
1992 births
Expatriate footballers in Japan
Daejeon Hana Citizen FC players
KSV Hessen Kassel players
TuRU Düsseldorf players